Vesterled is a natural gas pipeline system, which runs from the Heimdal field (Heimdal Riser platform) in the North Sea to St Fergus Gas Plant near Peterhead in Scotland. The name Vesterled is the term used by the Vikings for their westward voyages, i.e. vesterled = "the way westward".

History
Originally the Vesterled pipeline was known as the Frigg Norwegian Pipeline, which was built in 1974–1978 to transport gas from the Frigg field to the United Kingdom. It was laid in parallel to the Frigg UK Pipeline creating the Frigg Transportation System.  It became operational in August 1978.  As the Frigg field was running to cease production, the spur line from the Heimdal field was put in operation on 1 October 2001.

Technical description
The capacity of Vesterled is about 12 billion cubic meters of natural gas per year. The pipeline system is owned by Gassled and operated by Gassco.

References

External links

 Vesterled (Gassco website)

Energy infrastructure completed in 1978
North Sea energy
Natural gas pipelines in Norway
Natural gas infrastructure in the United Kingdom
Economy of Scotland
Norway–United Kingdom relations
Pipelines under the North Sea
1978 establishments in Norway
1978 establishments in Scotland